The 2020 Vuelta a Andalucía was a road cycling stage race that took place in the Andalucía region of Spain between 19 and 23 February 2020. It was the 66th edition of the Vuelta a Andalucía and is rated as a 2.Pro event as part of the 2020 UCI Europe Tour and the 2020 UCI ProSeries.

Teams
Twenty-one teams were invited to the race. Of these teams, eight are UCI WorldTour teams, twelve are UCI Professional Continental teams, and one is a UCI Continental teams. Of the starting peloton of 144 riders, 127 finished.

UCI WorldTeams

 
 
 
 
 
 
 
 

UCI Professional Continental Teams

 
 
 
 
 
 
 
 
 
 
 
 

UCI Continental Teams

Route

Stages

Stage 1
19 February 2020 – Alhaurín de la Torre to Grazalema,

Stage 2
20 February 2020 – Sevilla to Iznájar,

Stage 3
21 February 2020 – Jaen to Úbeda,

Stage 4
22 February 2020 – Villanueva Mesía to Granada,

Stage 5
23 February 2020 – Mijas to Mijas,  (ITT)

Classification leadership table

Classification standings

General classification

Points classification

Mountains classification

Teams classification

References

External links

 

2020 UCI Europe Tour
2020 UCI ProSeries
2020 in Spanish sport
2020
Vuelta a Andalucía